Last Man Standing is a 1987 action horror film directed by Damian Lee.

Plot
Roo Marcus has recently been released from the inhumane conditions of a mental institution and enters into the world of underground bare-knuckle fighting.

Cast
 Vernon Wells as Roo Marcus
 William Sanderson as Casper
 Michael Copeman as Napoleon
 Sonja Belliveau as Charlie
 Frank Moore as Tenny
 Réal Andrews as Razor
 Pete Dempster as Cannon
 Franco Columbu as Batty
 Danny Burnes as Gus
 George Chuvalo as Maxx
 Damian Lee as Sully
 Dave Schaller as Patch
 Kim Coates as Mr. Regan
 Lolita Davidovich as Groupie (as Lolita David)

Alternate titles
Last Man Standing was released under various other titles in different regions including Circle Man and Manfighter.

References

External links

1980s action horror films
1987 films
Films directed by Damian Lee
American boxing films
American action horror films
Films produced by Damian Lee
Films with screenplays by Damian Lee
1980s English-language films
1980s American films